KCSE may refer to:

 KCSE (FM), a radio station (90.7 FM) licensed to serve Lamar, Colorado, United States
 Kenya Certificate of Secondary Education